On Monday 23 January 1911, a collision between a passenger train and a coal train on the Taff Vale Railway line at Hopkinstown, outside Pontypridd in Wales, resulted in the loss of eleven (twelve according to the official report) lives. The accident, also known as the Hopkinstown rail disaster or the Coke Ovens collision, occurred at 9:48 am, when the 09:10 passenger train from Treherbert to Cardiff, heading towards Pontypridd and carrying about 100 people, rounded the bend at Gyfeillion Lower signal box with a clear signal ahead. The train collided with a stationary coal train that was using the same line. The impact caused the underframe of the front carriage to rise up and pierce the carriage directly behind it.

On 24 January a preliminary hearing was conducted at the New Inn Hotel in Pontypridd, where interviews were held and witness statements were taken. On the following Thursday a coroner's inquest was opened at Pontypridd Police Court. The inquest heard conflicting reports from signalmen Hutchings of the Gyfeillion Lower and Quick of the Rhondda Cutting Junction, the other signal box in control of the stretch of line where the accident took place. Due to lack of definite evidence an open verdict was returned; though the fireman of the coal train was censured for not alerting the signal box of the stationary train's position as he was required to do under Rule 55.

The Board of Trade enquiry, subsequent to the inquest, concluded that Hutchings had not, in fact, given the "Train Entering Section" signal for the coal train after Quick had accepted it, and Quick had subsequently accepted the passenger train, having forgotten that he had accepted the coal train earlier. Hutchings was also criticised for not replacing his signals to "Danger" as soon as he was aware of the conflict – if he had done so, the driver of the passenger train would have had about 30 seconds to observe the danger signal, and, even if he had been unable to stop the train, its speed would have been greatly reduced and the collision much less severe. A contributory factor was the use of two-position block instruments, which did not have distinct "Line Blocked" and "Line Clear" indications. If a three-position instrument had been used, Hutchings would not have offered the passenger train forward (and Quick would not have accepted it) while the instrument was still showing "Line Clear" for the coal train.

Sources

Train collisions in Wales
Railway accidents in 1911
1911 in Wales
Rail transport in Rhondda Cynon Taf  
1910s in Glamorgan
Accidents and incidents involving Taff Vale Railway
1911 disasters in the United Kingdom
January 1911 events